Agrisius albida is a moth of the subfamily Arctiinae. It is found in China (Kiangsu).

References

Moths described in 1952
Lithosiini
Moths of Asia